The Seville was a historic apartment building located at Indianapolis, Indiana.  It was built in 1921, and was a three-story, "C"-shaped, building on a raised basement.  It featured elaborate Spanish-influenced terra cotta ornamentation and a wide overhanging stamped tin boxed cornice.  It has been demolished.

It was listed on the National Register of Historic Places in 1987.

References

Apartment buildings in Indiana
Residential buildings on the National Register of Historic Places in Indiana
Residential buildings completed in 1921
Residential buildings in Indianapolis
National Register of Historic Places in Indianapolis